Nonington (variously, Nonnington, Nunyngton, Nonnyngton and Nunnington), is a civil parish and village in the southeast corner of Kent, situated halfway between the historic city of Canterbury and the channel port town of Dover. The civil parish includes the hamlets of Easole Street, to which it is conjoined and Frogham.

History
In 1800 Edward Hasted noted that the church of Nonington was antient (an old spelling of ancient), a chapel of ease to that of Wingham and was on the foundation of the college there by Archbishop Peckham in 1286. Then the church was given to the college. In 1558 Queen Mary granted it, among others, to the Archbishop of Canterbury.

The parish of Nonington was once made up of the now separate parishes of Nonington and Aylesham. The parish is served by the Grade I listed 'Church of St Mary'.
It also has a Baptist chapel, linked to Eythorne Baptist Church.

It is home to a community of the Bruderhof who use the old Nonington College of Physical Education, previously the (Grade I listed) St. Alban's Court, the home of the Hammond family from the Reformation until the late 1930s.  The Bruderhof currently use St Alban's Court as a boarding school.

Amenities
Nonington has its own primary school; Nonington CE Primary School. The school has recently been federated with Goodnestone Primary school. Nonington has a long history and has been operating as a school since the reign of Queen Victoria. The school has a number of historical artefacts that have been retained since this period including the school log book. There is a large tree in the centre of the playground which was supposedly planted by a pupil at the school.

The school has undergone a number of renovations and has a variety of additions to the main building. There is a story relating to a ghost that is said to roam the school when the school is empty; at weekends and at night. An entry in the school logbook from 1923 recounts how footprints were found in a recently laid floor that could not be explained as the school had been confirmed to be empty at the time. The origin of this spectre is said to predate the school buildings.

Nonington was noted in the Guinness Book of World Records for its 'Majesty Oak' in Fredville Park, the largest maiden oak tree in the UK.

The village is also on the Miner's Way Trail. The trail links up the coalfield parishes of East Kent.

References

External links 

 
 nonington.org

Villages in Kent
Hutterite communities in Europe
Civil parishes in Kent